The following is a list of Edgar Allan Poe Award for Best Motion Picture, one of the Edgar Awards awarded to authors and others by the Mystery Writers of America. The "Best Motion Picture" award was first presented in 1946 and was discontinued after 2009.

Winners

1940s

1950s

1960s

1970s

1980s

1990s

2000s

See also 
 :Category:Edgar Award winners
 :Category:Edgar Award-winning works

References

External links 
 Search the Edgar Award Winners And Nominees from the Edgar Awards website
 Edgar Allan Poe Awards from the Internet Movie Database

Film award winners
Lists of writers by award
Mystery and detective fiction awards
Awards established in 1946
1946 establishments in the United States
English-language literary awards
American film awards